Harper Township may refer to:

Harper Township, Cleveland County, Arkansas
Harper Township, McPherson County, Kansas